Sonjo may refer to:
the Sonjo people
the Sonjo language
Seonjo of Joseon, the 14th king of the Joseon dynasty, romanized as Sŏnjo in McCune–Reischauer